Quicksilver: Original Motion Picture Soundtrack is the soundtrack for the American film, Quicksilver, which was released in 1986, and stars Kevin Bacon, Jami Gertz, Paul Rodriguez, Louie Anderson, Laurence Fishburne and Rudy Ramos.

The film's theme song is "Quicksilver Lightning" which is written by Giorgio Moroder and Dean Pitchford, And is Performed by The Who's lead singer, Roger Daltrey, it was a minor hit on the rock charts, reaching number 11. The film score was composed by Tony Banks, of Genesis fame. Other music is contributed by performers such as Ray Parker Jr. and Peter Frampton.

A version of "The Motown Song" was covered by Rod Stewart in 1991, and included on his sixteenth solo album, Vagabond Heart, and released as a single.

Track listings

Personnel
Engineering
 Andy Jackson - Engineer
 David Leonard - Engineer
 Tim Boyle - Engineer
 Dave Concors - Engineer
 Will Gosling - Engineer
 Trevor Hallesy - Engineer
 Steve Hallquist - Engineer
 Daniel Lazerus - Engineer
 Brian Tench - Engineer
 John Vigran - Engineer
 Mark Wallis - Engineer
 David Thoener - Mixing
 Thomas Newman - Sound Effects
 George Budd - Sound Effects
 Bob Holmes - Creative Assistance
 Gary LeMel - Creative Assistance
 Judy Ross - Film Music Coordinator
 Elliot Lurie - Music Supervisor
 Becky Mancuso - Music Supervisor
 Barry Diament - Mastering
 Wally Traugott - Mastering
Album cover art
 Paul Jasmin - Album cover photography

Charts
Album - Billboard (North America)

References

1986 soundtrack albums
Albums produced by Alan Shacklock
Atlantic Records soundtracks